Coruche is a municipality in Santarém District in Portugal.

Coruche may also refer to:

 Coruche (Aguiar da Beira), in Guarda District, Portugal
 Coruche (wine region) in Portugal
 Coruche Biennial art exhibition

See also
Coluche, (Michel Gérard Joseph Colucci (1944–1986))